In 1994, Ford Motor Company created the position of the Henry Ford Technical Fellow. The appointment to Fellow is the most prestigious technical leadership position in the Company. It is intended to recognize exceptional engineers and scientists in research, product development, quality, information technology and manufacturing. The position was created to recognize the contributions of top technical experts with a national/international reputation in a key automotive related field.   Fellows are expected to provide technical expertise, guidance and leadership in the application of relevant engineering and/or scientific principles to product development, manufacturing, smart mobility, information technology, data and analytics, and other areas of the business on technical matters. They also play a major consultative role to the VP, Research & Advanced Engineering and Chief Technology Officer in the development of corporate technical strategy and plans, and serve as champions of the Technical Specialist Program in the Company. To date, there have been 16 individuals appointed as a Henry Ford Technical Fellow.

 1994: Rodney Edwards; Haren S. Gandhi; Wallace R. Wade
 1995: Priyaranjan Prasad; Louis R. Ross
 1996: Christopher L. Magee
 1997: Prof. Dr. Werner Kalkert
 1998: Richard Riff
 1999: Rodney J. Tabaczynski
 2001: Timothy P. Davis
 2002: Takeshi Abe
 2006: Davor Hrovat
 2010: James Buczkowski
 2013: Mike Tamor
 2017: Dimitar Filev
 2021: Debbie Mielewski

References 

Ford Motor Company